The Surgeon of Crowthorne: A Tale of Murder, Madness and the Love of Words is a non-fiction history book by British writer Simon Winchester, first published in England in 1998. It was retitled The Professor and the Madman: A Tale of Murder, Insanity, and the Making of the Oxford English Dictionary in the United States and Canada.

Plot
The book tells the story of the making of the Oxford English Dictionary (OED) and one of its most prolific early contributors, William Chester Minor, a retired United States Army surgeon. Minor was, at the time, imprisoned in the Broadmoor Criminal Lunatic Asylum, near the village of Crowthorne, in Berkshire, England.

The "professor" referred to in the North American title is Sir James Murray, the chief editor of the OED during most of the project. Murray was a talented linguist and had other scholarly interests, and had taught in schools and worked in banking. Faced with the enormous task of producing a comprehensive dictionary, with a quotation illustrating the uses of each meaning of each word, and with evidence for the earliest use of each, Murray enlisted the help of dozens of amateur philologists as volunteer researchers.

History of creation
A journalist with three decades of experience, and the author of a dozen travel-inspired books, Winchester's initial proposal to write a book about an obscure lexicographer was originally met with rejection. Only when HarperCollins editor Larry Ashmead read the proposal and championed the book did Winchester pursue the necessary research in earnest.  Of the project Ashmead said "we can make lexicography cool". It was Ashmead who persuaded Winchester to call the North American edition The Professor and the Madman (over Winchester's objection that Murray was not a professor), saying "No one here knows what the hell a Crowthorne is."

Reception
The book was a major success. Winchester went on to write The Meaning of Everything: The Story of the Oxford English Dictionary (2003) about the broader history of the OED.

Film adaptation

A movie version of the book, starring Mel Gibson as Murray and Sean Penn as Minor and directed by Farhad Safinia under the pseudonym P. B. Shemran, was released in 2019 with the title The Professor and the Madman. The movie rights for the book were bought by Gibson's Icon Productions in 1998. John Boorman wrote a script and was at one time tapped to direct, as was Luc Besson. Production began in 2016, but the release was delayed by legal disputes between parties in the film's production.

References

Editions

External links
 AskOxford.com interview Winchester speaks about the book to John Simpson, Chief Editor of the OED
Booknotes interview with Winchester on The Professor and the Madman, November 8, 1998.

1998 non-fiction books
American biographies
Books by Simon Winchester
Works derived from the Oxford English Dictionary
Viking Press books
Books about mental health
Non-fiction books adapted into films
History of mental health in the United Kingdom